Olympia "Lia" Vissi (born 15 May 1955) is a Greek-Cypriot singer, songwriter and composer who most notable for her two participations in the Eurovision Song Contest and being older sister of Greek Cypriot singer Anna Vissi.

Career
Vissi participated in the Eurovision Song Contest twice. In 1979, she was a supporting singer for Elpida, representing Greece and 1984 saw Vissi participate in the Cypriot national song contest with the song "Chtes", which came second.

Finally, in 1985 she represented Cyprus in the contest as a solo singer, singing her own composition To Katalava Arga, to which she also penned the lyrics. The Cypriot entry came 16th out of 19 songs, receiving 15 points, including 8 (rather than the usual maximum 12) from Greece. Cyprus also gave Greece only 8 points this year and total score of the Greek entry totaled 15, and thus Cyprus and Greece shared the sixteenth position. She took part in the 1991 Greek final for Eurovision, singing the anthem Agapa ti Gi. She was placed second behind Sophia Vossou. In 1992, Greek television decided not to televise the national final. Vissi submitted a song for consideration, Kapios, and found herself voted into second place yet again. 

In 2006, Vissi embarked on a political career, running for a seat in the House of Representatives of Cyprus in the 21 June elections. She represented the Democratic Rally in the Larnaca District but she was not elected.

References
 The Diggiloo Trush – Eurovision Song Contest Information
 An interview with Lia Vissi regarding her running-up for the office 
 Dutch Wikipedia article on Lia Vissi

1955 births
Living people
Cypriot composers
Eurovision Song Contest entrants for Cyprus
20th-century Cypriot women singers
Eurovision Song Contest entrants of 1985
Greek Cypriot singers
Modern Greek-language singers
People from Larnaca District
Thessaloniki Song Festival entrants
21st-century Cypriot women politicians
21st-century Cypriot politicians
20th-century Greek women singers